Bhakti yoga, also called Bhakti marga (literally the path of Bhakti), is a spiritual path or spiritual practice within Hinduism focused on loving devotion towards any personal deity. It is one of the three classical paths in Hinduism which lead to Moksha, the other paths being Jnana yoga and Karma yoga. 

The tradition has ancient roots. Bhakti is mentioned in the Shvetashvatara Upanishad where it simply means participation, devotion and love for any endeavor. Bhakti yoga as one of three spiritual paths for salvation is discussed in depth by the Bhagavad Gita.

The personal god varies with the devotee. It may include a god or goddess such as Ganesha, Krishna, Radha, Rama, Sita, Vishnu, Shiva, Shakti, Lakshmi, Saraswati, Parvati, Durga, and Surya among others.

The Bhakti marga involving these deities grew with the Bhakti Movement, starting about the mid-1st millennium CE, from Tamil Nadu in South India. The movement was led by the Saiva Nayanars and the Vaisnava Alvars. Their ideas and practices inspired bhakti poetry and devotion throughout India over the 12th-18th century CE. Bhakti marga is a part of the religious practice in Vaishnavism, Shaivism, and Shaktism.

Devotion may also be impersonal as discussed in the book Narada’s Way of Divine Love written by Swami Prabhavananda.

Philosophy 

The Sanskrit word bhakti is derived from the root bhaj, which means "divide, share, partake, participate, to belong to". The word also means "attachment, devotion to, fondness for, homage, faith or love, worship, piety to something as a spiritual, religious principle or means of salvation".

The term yoga literally means "union, yoke", and in this context connotes a path or practice for "salvation, liberation". The yoga referred to here is the "joining together, union" of one's Atman (true self) with the concept of Supreme Brahman (true Reality).

According to Samrat Kumar, bhakti yoga is an Indian tradition of "divine love mysticism", a spiritual path "synonymous for an intimate understanding of oneness and harmony of the eternal individual with the Divine (the universal Being) and all creatures, a constant delight". According to Yoga Journal, yoga scholar David Frawley writes in his book that bhakti yoga "consists of concentrating one's mind, emotions, and senses on the Divine."

Bhagavad Gita 

Bhakti yoga is one of three yoga taught in Bhagavad Gita. Bhakti yoga is, according to Peter Bishop, a devotee's loving devotion to a personal god as the path for spirituality. The other two paths are jnana yoga, the path of wisdom where the individual pursues knowledge and introspective self-understanding as spiritual practice, while karma yoga is path of virtuous action (karma) neither expecting reward nor consequence for doing the right thing, or nishkama karma. Later, new movements within Hinduism added raja yoga as the fourth spiritual path, but this is not universally accepted as distinct to other three.

Srimad Bhagavatam (Bhagavata Purana) 

The Bhagavata Purana is a popular and influential text in the Vaishnavism traditions, and it discusses Ishvara pranidhana (devotion to a personal god). The Sanskrit text presents various modes of bhakti specifically to incarnations of Vishnu, particularly in terms of "Narayana, Krishna". According to Edwin Bryant, and other scholars, the Bhakti yoga taught in this text is inspired by Yoga Sutras of Patanjali and Bhagavad Gita, and they focus on "the ultimate truths of the individual self and its loving relationship with a personal god". The presentation in the Bhagavata Purana is not in abstract terms, but through "charming and delightful tales that capture the heart and mind", the goal of Bhakti yoga, states Bryant.

The Uddhava Gita, which is the eleventh book of the Bhagavata Purana, discusses bhakti through a dialogue between Lord Krishna and Uddhava, his devotee. This text highlights the pure devotion and bhakti the gopis of Vrindavan had for Lord Krishna.

Traditions 

Hinduism, in its scriptures such as chapter 7 of the Bhagavad Gita, recognizes four kinds of devotees who practice Bhakti yoga. Some practice it because they are hard pressed or stressed by anxiety or their life's circumstances and see Bhakti yoga as a form of relief. The second type practice Bhakti yoga to learn about god out of curiosity and intellectual intrigue. The third type seek rewards in this or in afterlife through their Bhakti yoga. The fourth are those who love god driven by pure love, knowing and seeking nothing beyond that experience of love union.

According to these Hindu texts, the highest spiritual level is the fourth, those who are devoted because of their knowledge of love. The Bhagavad Gita states that all four types of Bhakti yogi are noble because their pursuit of Bhakti yoga sooner or later starts the journey on the path of spirituality, it keeps one away from negativity and evil karma, it causes spiritual transformation towards the goal of Bhakti yoga, to "know god as the essence within themselves and their true self always with god".

Major traditions include the Shaiva who worship the god Shiva; the Vaishnava who worship the god Vishnu (or his avatars such as Krishna and Rama); and the Shakta who worship the goddess Shakti (or her avatars such as Durga, Kali, Lakshmi, and Parvati). These are all considered manifestations or aspects of the same metaphysical reality called Brahman in Hinduism.

Panchayatana puja 

Panchayatana puja is a form of bhakti found in the Smarta tradition of Hinduism. It consists of the simultaneous worship of multiple deities: Shiva, Vishnu, Shakti, Surya and an Ishta Devata such as Ganesha or Skanda or any personal god of devotee's preference.

Philosophically, the Smarta tradition emphasizes that all images (murti) are icons of saguna Brahman, a means to thinking about the abstract Ultimate Reality called nirguna Brahman. The five or six icons are seen by Smartas as multiple representations of the one Saguna Brahman (i.e., a personal God with form), rather than as distinct beings. The ultimate goal in this practice is to transition past the use of icons, then follow a philosophical and meditative path to understanding the oneness of Atman (soul, self) and Brahman – as "That art Thou".

Saiva Siddhanta 
The Śaivasiddhānta tradition favors Bhakti yoga, emphasizing loving devotion to Shiva. Its theology presents three universal realities: the pashu (individual soul), the pati (lord, Shiva), and the pasha (soul's bondage) through ignorance, karma and maya. The tradition teaches ethical living, service to the community and through one's work, loving worship, yoga practice and discipline, continuous learning and self-knowledge as means for liberating the individual soul from bondage.

The historic Shaiva Siddhanta literature is an enormous body of texts. The Shaiva Siddhanta practices have focussed on abstract ideas of spirituality, worship and loving devotion to Shiva as SadaShiva, and taught the authority of the Vedas and Shaiva Agamas.

Shakti Bhakti 

Bhakti of goddess is another significant tradition, one found in Shaktism. The theology of oneness and unity of "the divine Goddess and the devotee", their eternal fearless love for each other is a theme found in Devi Gita, a text embedded inside the Devi-Bhagavata Purana. The specific Bhakti yoga practices amongst Shakta are similar to those in other traditions of Hinduism. The Shakta devotion is common in eastern states of India, particularly West Bengal. The personal god here varies, and includes Durga, Tara Ma (Buddhist influence), Kali and to a lesser extent Saraswati, Lakshmi, Bharat Mata (land goddess), according to June McDaniel.

Vaishnava Bhakti 
The Bhakti yoga tradition has been historically most associated with Vaishnavism. The personal god here is Vishnu or one of his avatars. In many regions, the loving devotion is either to Vishnu-Lakshmi (god-goddess) together, or through Lakshmi who is considered the shakti of Vishnu. The specific avatar varies by the devotee and region, but the most common are Krishna and Rama.

Chaitanya Mahaprabhu 

In the Krishna-oriented traditions of Vaishnavism, the Chaitanya Charitamrita by Krishnadasa Kaviraja interprets the section 7.5.23-24 of Bhagavata Purana to teach nine types of bhakti sadhana, in the words of Prahlada. David Haberman translates them as follows:

<blockquote> (1) śravaṇa ("listening" to the scriptural stories of Krishna and his companions), (2) kīrtana ("praising"; usually refers to ecstatic group singing), (3) smaraṇa ("remembering" or fixing the mind on Vishnu), (4) pāda-sevana (rendering service), (5) arcana (worshiping an image), (6) vandana (paying homage), (7) dāsya (servitude), (8) sākhya (friendship), and (9) ātma-nivedana (complete surrender of the self).</blockquote>

These nine principles of devotional service were incorporated by Rupa Goswami linked to Chaitanya Mahaprabhu as integral to spiritual practice focussed on Krishna.

 Meher Baba 
A movement led by Meher Baba states that "out of a number of practices which lead to the ultimate goal of humanity – God-Realisation – Bhakti Yoga is one of the most important. Almost the whole of humanity is concerned with Bhakti Yoga, which, in simple words, means the art of worship. But it must be understood in all its true aspects, and not merely in a narrow and shallow sense, in which the term is commonly used and interpreted. The profound worship based on the high ideals of philosophy and spirituality, prompted by divine love, doubtless constitutes true Bhakti Yoga''". Pashayan concurs that Bhakti Yogis are found on the mat, delivering pizza, in academia, and in politics and international relations. Where you least expect it, there's a Bhakti Yogi in the room with you whereby common ground can be actualized into productive solutions of today's salient issues, and problems can be resolved.

See also 
 Guru yoga
 Narada Bhakti Sutra
 Kirtan

References

Bibliography 
 
 
 
 
 

Bhakti movement
Yoga paths